is a Japanese professional footballer who plays as an attacking midfielder for  club Albirex Niigata.

Career
He is noted for being a free-kick specialist and emerging as a regular member at Tokyo Verdy in his debut season at the age of 17. Alongside Arsenal winger Ryo Miyaichi and FC Bayern Munich forward Takashi Usami, Takagi is considered part of what has been termed by the Japanese media as the "Platinum Generation."

National team career
In October 2009, Takagi was elected Japan U-17 national team for 2009 U-17 World Cup. He played all 3 matches and scored a goal against Brazil in first match.

Family 
He comes from a sports family, with his father Yutaka being a former professional baseball player, notably for Yokohama BayStars, and brother Toshiyuki is also a professional footballer.

Career statistics

Club
.

International

Honours
 Albirex Niigata
J2 League : 2022

 Individual
J2 League Best XI: 2022

References

External links
Profile at Albirex Niigata

1992 births
Living people
Association football people from Kanagawa Prefecture
Japanese footballers
Japan youth international footballers
J1 League players
J2 League players
Eredivisie players
Tokyo Verdy players
FC Utrecht players
Shimizu S-Pulse players
Albirex Niigata players
Japanese expatriate footballers
Association football midfielders